Charlene Liu is an American artist living and working in Oregon. "Using printmaking, painting, and papermaking processes, Liu samples and juxtaposes cultural references and the natural environment in an attempt to reconcile matters of biography and place."

Liu is an Associate Professor and the Printmaking Coordinator in the Department of Art at the University of Oregon. Solo exhibition venues include: Andrea Rosen Gallery 2 (New York), Taylor de Cordoba Gallery (Los Angeles), Shaheen Modern & Contemporary (Cleveland, Ohio), Virgil de Voldere Gallery (New York), Elizabeth Leach Gallery (Portland, Oregon), and Galeria Il Capricorno (Venice, Italy). Her work has been reviewed in The New York Times, Flash Art International, Los Angeles Times, and is held in the collections of the Museum of Modern Art (New York City), Progressive Art Collection (Cleveland), Tacoma Art Museum (Tacoma, Washington), and the New Museum (New York, NY).

Liu has an M.F.A. in Visual Arts from Columbia University (2003) and a B.A. from Brandeis University (1997).

References

Living people
American women artists
Artists from Oregon
Brandeis University alumni
Columbia University School of the Arts alumni
University of Oregon faculty
Year of birth missing (living people)